Serixia buruensis is a species of beetle in the family Cerambycidae. It was described by Stephan von Breuning in 1958.

Subspecies
 Serixia buruensis ceramensis Breuning, 1958
 Serixia buruensis buruensis Breuning, 1958

References

Serixia
Beetles described in 1958